Rambo is a 2012 Indian Kannada-language comedy thriller film written and directed by M S Sreenath. It was produced by Atlanta Nagendra and Sharan. Sharan and Madhuri Itagi played the leading roles. This is the 100th film of actor Sharan; it was released in September 2012. Arjun Janya is the music director for the film.

Plot
‘Rambo’ is a film that revolves around a trickster, Kitty (Sharan). He has a mother in the house. He has a maternal uncle to his company Premkumar (Tabla Naani). In a way it is Varahavatara from Kitty to his car broker business. He catches the sentiment in the society that any vehicle should not dash against a pig or vice versa. The superstitious belief is that it would smash the further life. No one is ready to take this danger in life.

Using the pig, Kitty was very cool in his set up to take the cars to custody for his business. In one of the cases a black colored car owned by Umesh is demanded by a Swamiji. The deal comes to Kitty and Premkumar. With this further danger also follows the two. When they open the bonnet they find a dead body. This body is chased by a terrorist gang and the same car is also chased by former minister Annappa (Rangayana Raghu) as it has ₹25 crores in it.

Knowing about the death, Kitty wants to hand it over to the party who demanded it and he finds a murdered person. In the later course of time they find it belongs to a minister and the money inside make them greedy. In such a situation Kitty wants to know why terrorists are behind that body in his truck of the car . He scans the body and finds a pen drive tucked inside. That explains a terrorist gang is up to a major demolition of peace.

Kitty comes straight to DC Vijayalakshmi (Shruthi) and becomes a good citizen with handing over everything to the government.

Production
Rambo is the joint venture production of Atlanta Nagendra and Sharan. The movie was shot in 47 locations with super 35 mm camera for 55 days.

Cast
 Sharan as Krishna Murthy alias Kitti
 Madhuri Itagi as Revathi
 Tabla Nani as Belt Kumar
 Sadhu Kokila as Dumil Krishna
 Rangayana Raghu as Mangalore Annappa
 Umashree
 Sanket Kashi
 Shruti
 M. S. Umesh
 Dharma 
Rishi 
Venkatesh Prasad 
Chandan Aachar 
Dharma 
Shiva manju 
Naveen Krishna (guest appearance) as Vatapi 
 Kurigalu Pratap
Naveen Shankar

Soundtrack

All the songs of the movie were screened in front of the media.

Rambo audio response has been very well appreciated for its catchy tunes and stylish presentation. Manethanka baare song made into the best songs of 2012 in Kannada. RAMBO makes it to the TOP KANNADA ALBUMS of 2012 in CD sales and Digital downloads.

Response
Rambo took a very good opening all over Karnataka. Rambo completes 25days in 40 centres all over karnataka.
 Rambo completes 50 days in major centers all over. 

Rambo makes it to the top 5 hits of 2012.

Reviews
Times of India gave 3 and 1/2 stars. Bangalore mirror rated as 3 star. Indiaglitz reviewed Rambo as Brilliant. CNN IBN live rated Rambo as complete entertainer. NDTV rated the movie as a good entertainer enjoyable from start to finish. DNA India gave a rating of 70%. Chitratara mentioned it as worth watching cinema. Chitraloka mentioned forget the logic enjoy the magic. Super good movies rated it as good entertainer and gave 3 1/2 stars. One India entertainment rated Rambo as entertaining. Cine loka mentioned Rambo - An Unmissable Laugh Riot. Indian express rated Rambo as hilarious comedy. Bharatstudent mentioned it as different concept, entertaining narrative, watch it.

Overseas Release
Rambo was released in all major centres all over USA 
 Rambo was premiered in Australia.

Awards

Rambo was nominated for Udaya film awards 2013 in 4 categories.

Rambo has been nominated for the Bangalore Times film awards 2012.

Rambo has been nominated for the 60th Idea filmfare awards 2013.

Rambo has been nominated for the Santosham Film Awards 2013.

Rambo has been nominated for ETV Kannada Sangeet Samman 2013 Awards in 4 categories.

Sequel

References

External links 

2012 films
2010s Kannada-language films
Indian comedy films
2012 comedy films
Films scored by Arjun Janya
2012 directorial debut films